Dwolla  is a United States-only fintech company that provides businesses with a connection to the ACH Network or RTP Network (Clearing House’s privately-owned real-time payments network).

History
The company was founded in 2008 with services based only in Iowa, and having two employees. After raising US$1.31 million in funding, Dwolla launched in the United States on December 1, 2010, with founders Ben Milne (CEO) and Shane Neuerburg (CTO), in Des Moines, Iowa, and initially with a few small banks and retailers. 

By June 2011, Dwolla had grown to 15 employees and 20,000 users, and it processed $1 million in a week for the first time.

Dwolla began with Veridian Credit Union for banking services, while The Members Group of the Iowa Credit Union League processed their transactions.

Products and services
Dwolla provides a white label service consisting of APIs to use the ACH system and white label services expanded from payouts to include instant bank authorization for debiting bank accounts

FiSync
On May 25, 2011, Dwolla released its FiSync integration, which aims to allow instantaneous transactions instead of the typical 2–3 day of the ACH Network transactions. , Dwolla had 11 financial institutions signed on, providing access to 600,000 potential customers. Dwolla quietly discontinued FiSync on January 31, 2017.

Government payments
As of April 2013, the Iowa Department of Revenue allows businesses that pay cigarette stamp taxes to use Dwolla as a method of payment. Iowa Governor Terry Branstad announced on January 6, 2014 that the state will expand the partnership to allow customers of Iowa Department of Transportation to pay fuel tax and vehicle registration costs online using the service. 

In February 2015, the US Treasury Department's Bureau of Fiscal Service added Dwolla to the system which allows US Federal agencies to issue and receive electronic payments.

Inadequate security practices
On February 27, 2016, the Consumer Financial Protection Bureau (CFPB) released its first data security-related enforcement action against Dwolla, Inc. Relying on its UDAAP-related authority, the CFPB alleged that Dwolla failed to maintain adequate data security practices despite representations made on the company website and in communications with consumers that the company has implemented practices that exceed industry standards. Among other requirements, Dwolla has agreed to settle and must cease making any misrepresentations about its data security practices.

The Dwolla Platform 
In 2016, Dwolla became a B2B SaaS company, selling its payment software directly to businesses so they can offer their customers bank transfers as a payment option in addition to credit cards. Since 2016, the Dwolla Platform has added new features along with real-time payments, push-to-debit payments and Same Day ACH credits or debits.

See also
List of online payment service providers

References

Further reading

 
 
  
https://www.desmoinesregister.com/story/money/business/2021/04/07/dwolla-des-moines-based-technology-company-adds-real-time-payments-faster-money-moves/7113172002/
https://www.businessinsider.com/payments-fintech-providers-and-startups-in-2021-emarketer
https://www.desmoinesregister.com/get-access/?return=https%3a%2f%2fwww.desmoinesregister.com%2fstory%2fmoney%2fbusiness%2f2021%2f03%2f09%2fdes-moines-based-dwolla-taps-mastercard-executive-dave-glaser-president-coo%2f4632789001%2f
https://tearsheet.co/podcasts/newly-appointed-ceo-brady-harris-on-the-future-of-dwolla-ach-and-payments/
https://techcrunch.com/2021/07/21/dwolla-raises-21m-to-bring-more-customizable-payment-and-money-transfer-options-to-fintechs-and-brands/

External links

Payment service providers
Electronic funds transfer
Online financial services companies of the United States
Privately held companies of the United States
2010 establishments in Iowa
Financial services companies established in 2010
Companies based in Des Moines, Iowa